Share This Place: Stories and Observations is a collaborative album between Mirah and Spectratone International (Lori Goldston and Kyle Hanson), released on K Records in 2007. The subject matter revolves around the lives of insects. Stop motion films by Britta Johnson were also a part of the project, which received a positive reception in publications such as AllMusic and Pitchfork Media.

Production
For the 2007 album, Mirah collaborated with Spectratone International, an ensemble formed by former Black Cat Orchestra founder and cellist Lori Goldston and accordionist Kyle Hanson. The songs are about the lives of insects. The project was inspired by the writing of 19th century entomologist and poet J. Henri Fabre, as well as The Insect Play by Karel Čapek.  It was released on K Records.

Reception

According to AllMusic, "Share This Place begins with an interesting concept that becomes something richer than might be expected. Paired with Johnson's films and in their own right, [the songs] are intricate and beautifully made, giving a larger scale to the big events in these tiny lives -- birth, death, mating, eating, sacrifice, survival -- while keeping the details that make them fascinating."

Track listing

Personnel

Mirah Yom Tov Zeitlyn - writing
Lori Goldston - writing
Kyle Hanson - writing
Britta Johnson - short films of stop-motion animation

References

External links
MirahMusic.com

Mirah albums
2007 albums
K Records albums